The 2020 UCI MTB Season was the fifthteeth season of the UCI MTB Season. The 2020 season began on 28 January 2020 with the Snow Bike Festival and ended in November 2020.

Events

January

February

March

July

August

September

October

November

National Championships

Continental Championships

References

UCI Mountain Bike World Cup